The 1998 season was the 76th season of competitive football in Ecuador.

National leagues

Serie A
Champion: LDU Quito (5th title)
International cup qualifiers:
1999 Copa Libertadores: LDU Quito, Emelec
1999 Copa CONMEBOL: Deportivo Cuenca
Relegated: Técnico Universitario, Panamá

Serie B
Winner: Macará (2nd title)
Promoted: Macará, Audaz Octubrino
Relegated: Green Cross, Calvi

Segunda
Winner: Universidad Católica
Promoted: Universidad Católica, Esmeraldas Petrolero

Clubs in international competitions

National teams

Senior team
The Ecuador national team played just one match in 1998: a friendly against Brazil.

External links
 National leagues details on RSSSF

 
1998